Contamination is the presence of an unwanted constituent in another substance.

Contamination may also refer to:

Health, environment, and technology

 Contamination control, generic terminology for all activities aiming to control the existence, growth and proliferation of contamination in certain areas

Medicine and health
 Biological contamination, the biological substances that threaten the health of living organisms
 Personnel contamination of cleanrooms, the shedding of and control of human skin tissue as contamination in cleanrooms in the healthcare and pharmaceutical industries
 Contaminated cannabis, potentially dangerous microorganisms in cannabis (marijuana)
 Contaminated haemophilia blood products, pathogens found in blood products
 List of medicine contamination incidents, a list of medicine contamination incidents, with articles on notable incidents
 List of contaminated cell lines, a list of cell cultures which have been cross-contaminated and overgrown by other cells

Food
 Food contamination, the presence in food of harmful chemicals or microorganisms that might cause illness
 2008 Irish pork contamination, dioxin contamination of pork products produced in Ireland in 2008
 Food contamination in China, a chronology of food contamination and safety incidents in China from 2003 to 2014
 List of food contamination incidents, a list of worldwide food contamination incidents from ancient times to 2015
 Contaminated carrots incident, the August 2004 incident in which 45 airline passengers became ill after consuming contaminated carrots

Environmental
 Pollution, contamination of the natural environment
 Radioactive contamination, also called radiological contamination
 Radioactive contamination from the Rocky Flats Plant, a former nuclear weapons production facility near Denver, Colorado that caused radiological contamination on and outside the site
 Radioactively contaminated areas, a list of Wikipedia pages describing radioactively contaminated areas and places
 Chemical contamination (disambiguation), a disambiguation page related to chemical hazards, adulterants, and weapons
 Soil contamination, also known as soil pollution
 Contaminated land, land that contain substances that may be harmful to health or the environment
 Seed contamination, mixing agricultural seeds with undesirable seeds such as weeds or soil containing non-agricultural seeds
 Contaminated site, a page specifically describing the urban planning term Brownfield land, land which may have been contaminated from prior use
 Groundwater pollution
 Well water contamination
 Arsenic contamination of groundwater
 List of Superfund sites in the United States, a list of sites contaminated by hazardous materials that require long-term response to remediate
 Camp Lejeune water contamination, the exposure of Marine Corp members and their family members to harmful chemicals in the water on the base from 1953 to 1987
 Contaminated Land Assessment and Remediation Research Centre, a University of Edinburgh multi-disciplinary centre of excellence that existed from 1989 to 2010
 Water contamination in Crestwood, Illinois, about contamination of the Village of Crestwood, Illinois water supply over a period of 40 years
 Hinkley groundwater contamination, hexavalent chromium pollution of groundwater sources for the town of Hinkley, California – an incident dramatized in the film Erin Brockovich
 Telluric contamination, contamination of the astronomical spectra by the Earth's atmosphere

Industrial and technological
 2007 United Kingdom petrol contamination, a 2007 situation in South East England in which silicon-contaminated petrol was thought to have damaged petrol engines in some vehicles
 Contamination Indicator Decontamination Assurance System, technology used to identify chemical contamination, a Department of Defense system
 War sand, sand that is contaminated by remains of weapons of war
 Contamination delay, the minimum time for an input change to change output in digital circuits

Research
 Contaminated Gaussian, a concept in statistical modeling

Forensics
 Contaminated currency, the finding of illegal drugs or other potential pathogens on paper money

Entertainment
 Contamination (film), 1980 science fiction horror film directed by Luigi Cozzi and starring Ian McCulloch
 Contaminator, a 1989 Italian science fiction film
 "Contamination" (Private Practice), an episode of the American television series Private Practice
 Contamination (album), 1996 album by Belgian electro-industrial act Suicide Commando
 "Contaminated" (song), 2019 song by American singer-songwriter Banks